Brown Earth Presbyterian Church (also known as Old Indian Church) is a church building in Grant County, South Dakota.  It was built in 1877, and was added to the National Register of Historic Places in 1984.

It is located about one mi1e east and one mile north of Stockholm, South Dakota.

References

External links

Presbyterian churches in South Dakota
Churches on the National Register of Historic Places in South Dakota
Churches completed in 1877
Churches in Grant County, South Dakota
National Register of Historic Places in Grant County, South Dakota
1877 establishments in Dakota Territory